Crunk Juice is the fifth and final studio album by American hip hop group Lil Jon & the East Side Boyz. It was released on November 16, 2004, under BME Recordings and TVT Records. The production was primarily handled by Lil Jon himself, who also collaborated in the executive production, alongside Bryan Leach, Rob McDowell, Emperor Searcy, Vince Phillips, the Neptunes and Rick Rubin. The album includes guest appearances from rappers and singers, like R. Kelly, Ludacris, Ice Cube, Usher, Bun B from UGK, Jadakiss, Nas, T.I., the Ying Yang Twins and Pharrell.

Lil Jon's next solo album, Crunk Rock, released on June 8, 2010, did not feature the East Side Boyz. As of 2022, Crunk Juice remains as the last release to feature the East Side Boyz.

Singles
Crunk Juice was supported by four singles.

Lead single "What U Gon' Do" was released on November 2, 2004.

The second single "Lovers & Friends", was released on November 9, 2004.

The third single "Real Nigga Roll Call", was released on December 21, 2004.
 
The fourth single "Get Crunk", was released on vinyl.

Commercial performance
Crunk Juice debuted at number 31 on the US Billboard 200 chart. In its second week, the album jumped to number three on the Billboard 200, selling 363,000 copies. It became Lil Jon & the East Side Boyz' first top-ten album in the United States. In the third week, the album remained in the top-ten on the Billboard 200, selling 196,000 copies. The album was certified 2x Multi-Platinum by the RIAA on January 12, 2005.

Critical reception

Crunk Juice received a wide range of reviews. Rating the album four stars out of five, David Jeffries of AllMusic called the album "just as exciting and remarkably powerful" as Back in Black by AC/DC, adding: "Production by production, record by record, Lil Jon has become a more detailed producer." Steve Jones of USA Today, rating the album three out of four stars, praised the album for "show[ing] that crunk comes in more than one flavor" in the R&B-themed "Lovers & Friends" and what he called an "experiment in crunk rock" in the Rick Rubin-produced "Stop Fuckin' With Me".

In contrast, for a three-and-a-half stars out of five review, Orisanmi Burton of AllHipHop commented: "What the album lacks in artistry and maturity, it makes up for in energy and rhythm." Critics in Lil Jon's hometown Atlanta also offered mixed reviews. Sonia Murray of The Atlanta Journal-Constitution called Lil Jon a "more numbingly simple chanter than noteworthy rapper...[who] now has the cachet to get A-list acts to join in on the inanity."Creative Loafing Atlanta expressed shock at the presence of "Lovers & Friends", with one critic calling it "something they'd play at an eighth-grade dance." Neil Drumming of Entertainment Weekly graded the album with a C, calling the songs "practically all hook...recited ad nauseam in Jon’s throaty growl...with over-the-top vitriolic rants and nausea-inducing misogyny."

Other reviews were more scathing. Lee Henderson of PopMatters called Lil Jon "the Raffi of gangsta rap" due to "reduc[ing] rap to endless and incredibly stupid choruses of nasty-talk" in the album. Matt Ozga of Prefix panned the album for what he called Lil Jon's "questionable ability as a producer" and "fingernails-on-an-eardrum voice" and lyrics with "vile, witless anti-woman venom", in rating the album 2.5 out of five points. Pete Cashmore of NME rated the album four points out of 10: "It’s almost laughably one-note, devoid of nuance, stunted of vocabulary and aeons too long."

Flavored malt beverage
Crunk Juice is also the name of a once popular flavored malt beverage launched by Gila Brew Co., LLC. It was made by 7th Street Brewing. They announced in 2011 they were going to relaunch the brand and have new package designs and a new flavors with a smoother taste. It was made available to purchase in several major US cities like Philadelphia.

Track listing 

Notes
 Track 6 contains samples of the remix of "Sippin' & Spinnin' [Remix]", performed by Gangsta Boo, Playa Fly and Bun B.
 Track 10 contains samples of "Mandatory Suicide" and "Raining Blood", performed by Slayer.
 Track 12 contains samples of "Lovers and Friends", performed by Michael Sterling.
 Track 17 contains samples of "Tonight", performed by Kleeer. & interpolation of "Saturday Love" performed by Alexander O'Neal & Cherrelle.
 Early pressings of this album erroneously credited Fat Joe (rather than Jadakiss) as one of the rappers in "The Grand Finale".

Bonus remix disc 
Confirmed by Artist Direct.

DVD

Chopped & Screwed

| title19  = Lean Back (Remix) (featuring Fat Joe, Mase, & Eminem)
| length19 = 4:12

Personnel 
Adapted from Artist Direct anad AllMusic

 8Ball – primary artist
 Scotty Beats – mixing, producer
 Big Sam – rapping
 Michael Blackwell – photography
 Warren Bletcher – assistant engineer, mixing assistant
 Bun B – primary artist
 Josh Butler – engineer
 Chris Carmouche – engineer
 Andrew Coleman – engineer
 DJ Flexx –  audio production, engineer producer, rapping
 Nate Dogg –  primary artist, rapping
 8Ball and MJG –  guest artist, rapping
 Emperor Searcy – executive producer
 Fat Joe – primary artist, rapping
 Gary Fly – assistant engineer, mixing assistant
 John Frye – engineer, mixing
 Gangsta Boo – primary artist, rapping
 Abel Garibaldi – engineer
 Stephen Georgiafandis – engineer
 Bo Hagon – primary artist
 Ice Cube –  guest artist, rapping
 Jazze Pha –  guest artist, rapping
 LaMarquis Mark Jefferson – bass
 R. Kelly –  guest vocals
 L-Roc – Keyboards
 Jason Lader – engineer, mixing
 Bryan Leach – executive producer
 Jonathan Lewis – producer
 Craig Love – guitar
 Lil Bo – rapping
 Lil Scrappy –  primary artist, rapping
 Craig Love – guitar
 Ludacris – guest artist rapping
 Rob McDowell – executive producer
 Ian Mereness – engineer
 MHG – primary artist
 Nas –  rapping
 The Neptunes – audio production, producer
 Oobie – primary artist
 Vince Phillips – executive producer
 Pimpin' Ken – performer, primary artist
 Rick Rubin – producer
 Andrew Scheps – mixing
 Paolo Sheehy – engineer
 Jonathon "Lil Jon" Smith – executive producer, mixing, producer
 Snoop Dogg –  guest artist, rapping
 Scott Storch – keyboards, 
 Chris Steinmetz – engineer
 Suga Free – primary artist
 Brian Sumner – engineer
 T.I. –  primary artist, rapping
 Trillville – primary artist
 Usher –  guest artist, vocals
 Mark Vinten – engineer
 Benjamin Wheelock – design
 Pharrell Williams –  guest artist, vocals
 Ying Yang Twins –  guest artist, rapping
 Wassim Zreik – engineer
Danny Zook – sample clearance

Charts

Weekly charts

Year-end charts

Certifications

References 

2004 albums
Lil Jon & the East Side Boyz albums
Albums produced by Lil Jon
Albums produced by the Neptunes
Albums produced by Rick Rubin